The Awful Truth is a 1937 American screwball comedy film directed by Leo McCarey and starring Irene Dunne and Cary Grant. Based on the 1922 play The Awful Truth by Arthur Richman (1886-1944), the film recounts a distrustful rich couple who begin divorce proceedings, only to interfere with one another's romances. This was McCarey's first film for Columbia Pictures, with the dialogue and comic elements largely improvised by the director and actors. Irene Dunne's costumes were designed by Robert Kalloch. Although Grant tried to leave the production due to McCarey's directorial style, The Awful Truth saw his emergence as an A-list star and proponent of on-the-set improvisation.

The film was a box office hit and was nominated for six Academy Awards, including Best Picture, Best Actress (Dunne), and Best Supporting Actor (Ralph Bellamy, winning for Best Director (McCarey). The Awful Truth was selected in 1996 for preservation in the Library of Congress' National Film Registry.

The Awful Truth was the first of three films co-starring Cary Grant and Irene Dunne, followed by My Favorite Wife (1940) and Penny Serenade (1941) (the latter of which earned Grant a nomination for the Academy Award for Best Actor).

Plot
Jerry Warriner (Cary Grant) tells his wife he is going on vacation to Florida, but instead spends the week at his sports club in New York City. He returns home to find that his wife, Lucy (Irene Dunne), spent the night in the company of her handsome music teacher, Armand Duvalle (Alexander D'Arcy). Lucy claims his car broke down unexpectedly. Lucy discovers that Jerry did not actually go to Florida. Their mutual suspicion results in divorce proceedings, with Lucy winning custody of their dog. The judge orders the divorce finalized in 90 days.

Lucy moves into an apartment with her Aunt Patsy (Cecil Cunningham). Her neighbor is amiable but rustic Oklahoma oilman Dan Leeson (Ralph Bellamy), whose mother (Esther Dale) does not approve of Lucy. Jerry subtly ridicules Dan in front of Lucy, which causes Lucy to tie herself more closely to Dan. Jerry begins dating sweet-natured but simple singer Dixie Belle Lee (Joyce Compton), unaware that she performs an embarrassing, sexually suggestive act at a local nightclub.

Convinced that Lucy is still having an affair with Duvalle, Jerry bursts into Duvalle's apartment only to discover that Lucy is a legitimate vocal student of Duvalle and is giving her first recital. Realizing he may still love Lucy, Jerry undermines Lucy's character with Mrs. Leeson even as Dan and Lucy agree to marry. When Jerry attempts to reconcile with Lucy afterward, he discovers Duvalle hiding in Lucy's apartment and they have a fistfight while Dan and his mother apologize for assuming the worst about Lucy. When Jerry chases Armand out the door, Dan breaks off his engagement to Lucy and he and his mother return to Oklahoma.

Some weeks pass, and Jerry begins dating high-profile heiress Barbara Vance (Molly Lamont). Realizing she still loves Jerry, Lucy crashes a party at the Vance mansion the night the divorce decree is to become final. Pretending to be Jerry's sister, she undermines Jerry's character, implying that "their" father was working class rather than wealthy. Acting like a showgirl, she recreates Dixie's risqué musical number from earlier in the film. The snobbish Vances are appalled.

Jerry attempts to explain away Lucy's behavior as drunkenness, and says he will drive Lucy home. Lucy repeatedly sabotages the car on the ride to delay their parting. Pulled over by motorcycle police officers, who believe Jerry is drunk, Lucy manages to wreck the car. The police give the couple a lift to Aunt Patsy's nearby cabin. Although sleeping in different (but adjoining) bedrooms, Jerry and Lucy slowly overcome their pride and a series of comic mishaps in order to admit "the awful truth" that they still love one another. They reconcile at midnight, just before their divorce is to be finalized.

Cast
The cast includes:

Pre-production

The film is based on the stage play The Awful Truth by playwright Arthur Richman. In that play, created on September 18, 1922 at the Henry Miller's Theater of Broadway (current Stephen Sondheim Theatre), Norman Satterly divorces his wife, Lucy Warriner Satterly, after they accuse one another of infidelity. Lucy is about to remarry, but needs to clear her name before her fiancé will agree to go forward with the marriage. As she tries to salvage her reputation, she falls in love again with her ex-husband and they remarry.

There were two previous film versions, a 1925 silent film The Awful Truth from Producers Distributing Corporation starring Warner Baxter and Agnes Ayres and a 1929 sound version from Pathé Exchange,  The Awful Truth, starring Ina Claire and Henry Daniell. Producer D.A. Doran had purchased the rights to the play for Pathé. When Pathé closed, he joined Columbia Pictures. Columbia subsequently purchased all of Pathé's scripts and screenplay rights for $35,000 ($ in  dollars). Doran chose to remake the film in 1937, just as Columbia head Harry Cohn was hiring director Leo McCarey to direct comedies for the studio.

Cohn offered the film to director Tay Garnett. Garnett read Dwight Taylor's script, and felt it was "about as funny as the seven-year-itch in an iron lung." He turned it down. According to Garnett, McCarey accepted the project simply because he needed work. "Sure, the script was terrible, but I've seen worse. I worked it over for a few weeks, changed this and that. I finally decided I could make something of it."

McCarey did not like the narrative structure of the play, the previous film versions, or the unproduced Pathé script. Cohn had already assigned Everett Riskin to produce the film, and screenwriter Dwight Taylor had a draft script. Taylor changed Norman Satterly to Jerry Warriner, got rid of much of the play's moralistic tone, and added a good deal of screwball comedy. Jerry is violence-prone (he punches Lucy in the eye), and the couple fight over a necklace (not a dog). Much of the action in Taylor's script is set at Jerry's club. The mishaps in the script cause Jerry to crack up emotionally. When the couple visit their old home (which is being sold at auction), his love for his wife is rekindled.

McCarey didn't like Taylor's script. He believed, however, that The Awful Truth would do well at the box office. With the Great Depression in its seventh year, he felt audiences would enjoy seeing a picture about rich people having troubles. During face-to-face negotiations with Cohn, McCarey demanded $100,000 ($ in  dollars) to direct. Cohn balked. McCarey wandered over to a piano and began to play show-tunes. Cohn, an avid fan of musicals, decided that anyone who liked that kind of music had to be talented—and he agreed to pay McCarey's fee. He also agreed not to interfere in the production.

McCarey's hiring was not announced until April 6, 1937. Riskin withdrew from the film as McCarey insisted on producing.

Script
McCarey worked with screenwriter Viña Delmar and her regular collaborator, her husband, Eugene. The couple had written racy novels as well as the source material and screenplay for McCarey's Make Way for Tomorrow. The Delmars refused to work anywhere but their home, visit the studio or the set, or to meet any of the actors when working on a script. In a letter to author Elizabeth Kendall, Viña Delmar said that McCarey worked with them on the script at their home, suggesting scenes. McCarey asked the Delmars to drop the major plot points of the play—which focused on Dan Leeson's attempt to purchase mineral rights, a fire in Lucy Warriner's apartment building, and Lucy's midnight meeting with another man at a luxurious mountain resort—and focus on the pride which Jerry and Lucy feel and which keeps them from reconciling.

According to the Delmars, they completed a script which included musical numbers, making it resemble musical theatre more than screwball comedy. It also largely retained the play's narrative structure, with four acts: the break-up at the Warriner house, events at Jerry Warriner's sports club, arguments and misunderstandings at Lucy Warriner's apartment, and a finale at Dan Leeson's apartment. The sets were simple, and few actors were needed.

According to other accounts, Mary C. McCall Jr., Dwight Taylor (again), and Dorothy Parker all worked on the script as well. None of their work was used by McCarey, and Taylor even asked that his name be taken off the script. Ralph Bellamy says that McCarey himself then wrote a script, completely reworking Delmar's effort. Harry Cohn was not happy with McCarey's decision to abandon Delmar's work, but McCarey convinced the studio boss that he could rework it. Film historians Iwan W. Morgan and Philip Davies say that McCarey retained only a single aspect of Delmar's work: The alleged infidelity of both man and wife.

Casting
Irene Dunne had freelanced and had not been under contract to a studio since her arrival in Hollywood. She appeared in Theodora Goes Wild (1936) for Columbia, and despite her misgivings about doing comedy her performance had garnered her an Academy Award nomination as Best Actress. Dunne wanted to undertake a new project quickly after negative reaction to her performing in blackface in Show Boat (also 1936). Her agent, Charles K. Feldman, helped develop The Awful Truth for Dunne, and the film was rushed into production to accommodate her. McCarey wanted her for the film because he thought the "incongruity" of a "genteel" actress like Dunne in screwball comedy was funny, and she was asked to appear in it even though Delmar was still working on a script. Dunne was attached to the picture in mid-February 1937, although commitments to other stage and film projects meant production could not begin for several months. Dunne was paid $75,000 ($ in  dollars) for her work. Dunne later said her decision to work on the film was "just an accident".

Cary Grant was cast three days after Dunne. Grant had also recently become a freelance actor without long-standing contractual obligations to any studio. By late 1936, he was negotiating a contract with Columbia. He ran into McCarey on the street, and told McCarey he was free. In February 1937, he signed a non-exclusive contract with Columbia Pictures in which he agreed to make four films over two years, provided each film was a prestige picture. He was paid $50,000 ($ in  dollars) to appear in The Awful Truth. Grant was eager to work with McCarey, McCarey wanted Grant, and Cohn assigned Grant to the picture.

For Ralph Bellamy, a contract player with Columbia, the film was just another assignment. Delmar's draft script, sent to Bellamy by his agent, originally described Dan Leeson as a conservative, prudish Englishman, a role written with Roland Young in mind. Per his agent's request, Bellamy ignored the script. Some time later, Bellamy got a call from his good friend, the writer Mary McCall, who asked him to work with her on redeveloping the role. McCall had been instructed to change the Leeson character into someone from the American West. They spent an afternoon together, and recrafting the character as well as writing a scene for his entrance in the film. After more time passed, Bellamy ran into writer Dwight Taylor at a cocktail party and learned that Taylor was rewriting his part. After a few weeks more, Dorothy Parker called Bellamy to tell him she was now working on the script and changing his role once more. The second week of June 1937, Bellamy's agent told him he'd been cast in The Awful Truth and was to report to the studio the next Monday. His casting was announced on June 23.

Joyce Compton was cast on June 9, and Alexander D'Arcy was cast some time before July 11.

For the animal role of Mr. Smith, two dogs were cast but did not work out. Skippy, better known to the public as "Asta" in the Thin Man film series, was cast at the end of June. Skippy proved difficult to work with. For a critical scene in which Mr. Smith is to leap into Jerry Warriner's arms, a white rubber mouse (one of the dog's favorite toys) was placed in Cary Grant's breast pocket. But whenever Grant held his arms open, Skippy would dodge him at the last moment. It took several days to get the shot. The human cast of The Awful Truth was also forced to take several unscheduled days of vacation in late July 1937 because Skippy was booked on another film.

Pre-production activity
The Awful Truth was budgeted at $600,000 ($ in  dollars). Pre-production on the film neared completion at the beginning of May 1937. Stephen Goosson was the supervising art director (his role today would be called production designer), and Lionel Banks the unit art director. Goosson was a 20-year veteran art director for Columbia Pictures, and The Awful Truth is considered among his most important films of the 1930s. Lionel Banks was primarily responsible for the production design of the film. He specialized in films set in the present day, and created restrained, well-crafted Art Deco sets for the picture. The Awful Truth is considered one of his more elegant designs.

Costumes
Columbia Pictures' chief costume and fashion designer, Robert Kalloch, created Dunne's wardrobe. His work was personally approved by studio head Harry Cohn. The clothes were the most elegant and expensive yet worn by her on film, and costume design historian Jay Jorgensen has described them as "magnificent". In 2012, Vanity Fair ranked The Awful Truth as one of the 25 most fashionable films ever made in Hollywood.

Principal photography
Principal photography began on June 21, 1937, without a completed script. This so concerned Ralph Bellamy that the Friday before filming started he contacted Harry Cohn to ask where the script was. Cohn declined to say anything about the film, and allowed Bellamy to talk to Leo McCarey. Bellamy went to McCarey's home to discuss the issue with him. McCarey was charming and witty, but evaded all of Bellamy's questions and concerns.

Initial disruptiveness of McCarey's working style
The first four or five days on the set were deeply upsetting to Dunne, Grant, and Bellamy due to the lack of a script and McCarey's working methods. McCarey had the cast sit around on the set the first few days and largely swap stories. The lack of rehearsal activity and script caused Dunne such emotional distress that she spontaneously burst into tears several times each day. Grant was so nervous that at times he became physically ill. When McCarey bowed to the cast's concerns and blocked a scene for Dunne and Grant, Grant refused to perform it.

Cary Grant in particular was unnerved by McCarey's behavior and lack of a script. Grant had spent most of his career at Paramount Studios, which had a factory-like approach to motion picture production; actors were expected to learn their lines and be ready every morning, and shooting schedules were strictly enforced. McCarey's improvisational style was deeply unsettling to Grant, and at the end of the first week Grant sent Cohn an eight-page memorandum titled "What's Wrong With This Picture". Grant asked Cohn to let him out of the film, offering to do one or more pictures for free and even saying he'd reimburse Cohn $5,000 if he were released. McCarey was so angry at Grant that he stopped speaking to him and told Cohn he'd kick in another $5,000 to get Grant off the film. Cohn ignored both the memo and the offers. Grant also sought to switch roles with Bellamy and asked Cohn to pressure McCarey into sticking to a more conventional style of filmmaking. Again, Cohn said no to Grant's requests. McCarey later said that Grant "had no sound judgment" when it came to determining what made for good comedy, and McCarey seemed to harbor a grudge against Grant for decades for trying to get out of the picture.

Cast support for improvisation
According to Bellamy, after the first five days, the three leads began to believe McCarey was a comedy genius.

McCarey believed that improvisation was the key to great comedy. "[A] lot of times we'd go into a scene [on The Awful Truth] with nothing at all", he said. His working method was to ask his cast to improvise the scene, creating their own dialogue and blocking their own action before allowing cameras to roll. If a problem arose with a scene, McCarey would sit at a piano on the set and pick out tunes and sing until a solution came to him. McCarey supported his actors' comedy and other choices, which quickly alleviated the tension which had built up on the set. For example, Ralph Bellamy was told to bring a selection of clothing from his own extensive, personal wardrobe. He did so, but was worried that he had not been given costuming. McCarey told him that the clothes he'd brought from home fit the part perfectly, which made Bellamy feel comfortable in his acting and comedy choices. McCarey was also extremely patient with his cast, understanding of their concerns, and sympathetic to their needs and problems. He also used his own wit to keep his cast in good humor. Irene Dunne later recalled that the entire cast loved working on the picture because every day was full of laughter. Many actors didn't want each day's work to end, because they were having such a good time.

Cary Grant began trusting the director once he realized that McCarey recognized Grant's strengths and welcomed Grant's ideas about blocking, dialogue, and comic bits. McCarey also had the ability to get his performers to mimic his own unique mannerisms. (It was something Irene Dunne thoroughly admired.) McCarey taught Grant a repertoire of comic vocalizations (like grunts) and movements and asked him to work with them. In turn, Grant imitated much of McCarey's own mannerisms and personality, becoming a "clone" of McCarey. Grant biographer Graham McCann says it would be an "overstatement" to say that McCarey gave Grant an on-screen personality. Grant had been working on this acting persona for some time; McCarey merely made Grant think more precisely about what he was trying to accomplish on camera. Additionally, McCarey worked to give Grant comic dialogue and physical comedy (like pratfalls) as well as sophisticated dialogue and urbane moments, efforts which Grant also deeply appreciated. Over time, Grant came to feel liberated rather than inhibited by the lack of a script, and seized the chance to make sure that the film's humor reflected his own. According to Ralph Bellamy, Grant enjoyed knowing that the audience was laughing at him, and worked to encourage it. Grant also used his early feelings of frustration to build his character's emotional and sexual frustration in the film.

Most of The Awful Truth was improvised on the set. McCarey had two guides for directing the film. The first was that he believed the film was the "story of my life", because McCarey based many scenes and comic moments on misunderstandings he had had with his own wife (although they never accused one another of infidelity). The second guide was McCarey's own lengthy experience directing comedy. Jerry Warriner's need to find a lie to cover for his "boys' night out away from the wives" is a typical scenario McCarey used in many feature motion pictures and short films. It was also common in many of the Laurel and Hardy shorts which McCarey directed for only the man's alibi to break down. Subsequently, in The Awful Truth, it is Jerry's alibi that crumbles. The bowler hat sequence in Lucy's apartment was based on a standard bit McCarey had frequently used in Laurel and Hardy films (as well as in the Marx Brothers' comedy Duck Soup (1933), which McCarey had also directed). Dunne's increasingly outrageous mishaps with the car radio in the scene after Jerry and Lucy leave the Vance mansion is similar to Harpo Marx's misadventures with a radio in Duck Soup and incorporates the straight man (Grant for Oliver Hardy) from Laurel and Hardy bits.

McCarey also relied on his ability to craft a narrative from a series of unrelated sketches, and he often staged portions of his films like musicals, inserting a song to tie elements together.

Improvising the film
Irene Dunne had never met Cary Grant before, but she later recalled that they "just worked from the first moment" and called Grant a very generous actor. Cary Grant, in turn, said "we just clicked". Dunne so trusted his comedy judgment that she would often turn to him after a take and ask in a whisper, "Funny?"

Nearly every day during principal photography, Leo McCarey would arrive in the morning with ideas for the film written down on scraps of paper. On days when he had nothing in mind, McCarey would arrive on the set and play the piano until inspiration struck. He would then have the script girl write down his ideas or dialogue, and give the actors their instructions. Although he asked the cast to rehearse scenes, McCarey also encouraged his actors to improvise and build up the scene on their own. At times, McCarey himself acted out bits with the performers. McCarey continued to meet with screenwriter Viña Delmar every evening, sitting with her in a parked car on Hollywood Boulevard and improvising scenes for her to write down. McCarey also relied for dialogue on writer Sidney Buchman, who had joined Columbia in 1934 and who had written Theodora Goes Wild for Irene Dunne. Some of the best lines and comic moments in the film remained improvised, however. For example, McCarey himself came up with the idea of arguing over a dog rather than property. Another example occurs when Cary Grant appears at Lucy's apartment while she is meeting for the first time with Dan Leeson. The writers did not have a line of dialogue for Grant, who ad-libbed the line, "The judge says this is my day to see the dog." Grant and Dunne also came up with the idea for Jerry to tickle Lucy with a pencil while Dan Leeson is at Lucy's door. Grant quickly became an accomplished improvisational actor during the shoot. He ad-libbed with such speed and composure that his co-stars often "broke character".

The nightclub scene was apparently also somewhat improvised on the set. In the Delmar script, Jerry's date is named Toots Biswanger and the scene is meant to parody the novel Gone with the Wind (two years before the film). She has a Southern American English accent, and Toots believes her song is a tribute to the novel. Jerry has a line in which he slyly criticizes Lucy's date by telling Dan "It's a book." As Toots sings the song's critical line ("my dreams are gone with the wind"), the wind machine on the stage was to have blown off her hat, then her muff, then her cape. On the set, the singer's name is changed to Dixie Belle, much of the dialogue is improvised, and the wind machine joke changed to a more restrained blowing of the dress.

According to Dunne, the action and dialogue for the scene in the Vance mansion was all written on the set. Dunne choreographed the dance and at least one line of dialogue, while the bit with the long handkerchief was a classic comic routine from silent films.

Columbia Pictures head Harry Cohn was not happy with McCarey's directorial methods, either. On the first day of shooting, he walked onto the soundstage to see Bellamy singing Home on the Range off-key while Dunne tried to pick out the tune on a piano. He shook his head in disbelief and left. Later, Cohn became angry when he learned McCarey was apparently dawdling on the set by playing the piano and telling stories. He angrily confronted McCarey in front of the cast and crew, shouting, "I hired you to make a great comedy so I could show up Frank Capra. The only one who's going to laugh at this picture is Capra!" When Cohn caught McCarey playing the piano another time, McCarey dismissed his concerns by claiming to be writing a song for the film. Cohn also came on the set the day Harold Lloyd was visiting. Cohn was so incensed that McCarey seemed to be telling jokes that he ordered the set cleared. Lloyd departed, and so did McCarey. Cohn finally reached McCarey at home, and in a profanity-laced conversation demanded that McCarey return to work. McCarey demanded in turn that Cohn apologize personally to everyone on the set, and send his apology to Lloyd. Cohn, unwilling to abandon the picture, perfunctorily apologized. Nevertheless, Cohn did not rein in the director. Cohn decided instead to write the entire picture off as a loss, since he was obligated to pay Dunne's salary whether the film was made or not and he could not fire McCarey since only McCarey knew where the film was headed.

Improvisation proved to be a problem for actor Alexander D'Arcy, who played the suave musician Armand Duvalle. Initially, D'Arcy portrayed Duvalle as French. Columbia Pictures' in-house censors vetoed his performance, saying it would offend overseas audiences. D'Arcy tried an Austrian, Italian, Spanish, and even vaguely South American persona. Each time, the censors disapproved of his work. Finally, after much experimentation, the actor's makeup was changed to fair from swarthy, he was told not to gesticulate too much, and he created a nondescript, vaguely European accent (which was nicknamed "Spenchard") for his role. The accent proved difficult to maintain. During long takes, D'Arcy would slip into his native French-inflected voice, forcing these scenes to be reshot multiple times.

Improvisation could sometimes be a risky choice for the production in other ways as well. Delmar's script called for the film to be set in Connecticut. The critical plot element had the divorce court judge issue a 90-day interlocutory decree, and it is during this period in which most of the action in the film occurs. As filming commenced, it became clear that no one knew if Connecticut permitted interlocutory decrees. It turned out that the state did not, and Columbia Pictures' in-house lawyers could not determine which state did. By coincidence, David T. Wilentz, the New Jersey Attorney General, was visiting Los Angeles. McCarey called him on the telephone, and Wilentz confirmed that New Jersey divorce courts used them. The setting of the film was then changed to New Jersey. Improvisation also led to minor visual inconsistencies in the film, such as when Jerry Warriner appears to both stand and sit during the divorce proceedings.

Songs and choreography
During pre-production, McCarey knew that he needed two songs for important scenes in the picture. Composer Ben Oakland and lyricist Milton Drake wrote two numbers for the film, "I Don't Like Music" and "My Dreams Are Gone with the Wind". Both were finished by the time principal photography began. Compton's original delivery of "My Dreams Are Gone with the Wind" and Dunne's reprise of it were filmed by July 25.

One critical scene in The Awful Truth occurs in a nightclub, during which both Dunne and Grant dance. In a second scene, Dunne's character dances in front of Jerry, his fiancée, and her family. Usually, the production would hire a choreographer for these scenes, but McCarey declined to do so. Instead, he asked an African American youth working on the Columbia lot to teach Dunne and Grant how to dance. Their inept efforts to imitate him made their on-screen dances funnier. Ralph Bellamy was required to do the fictional "Balboa Stomp" in the nightclub scene while Irene Dunne largely stands by, feebly trying to imitate him. The dance proved so physically intimidating that Bellamy lost  and his muscles and joints were sore for weeks afterward. Irene Dunne choreographed the burlesque dance which her character performs at the Vance mansion to embarrass Jerry. In rehearsal, Leo McCarey asked her to insert a "stripper bump" into her routine. Dunne replied, "Never could do that." McCarey laughed so hard at her response that he asked her to include it in the performance.

One of the film's best remembered comedy moments is when Lucy Warriner accompanies an out of tune Dan Leeson on the piano while he sings "Home on the Range". This was filmed on June 21, the first day of filming. McCarey wanted the song in the film, but knew neither performer would agree if requested. Instead, McCarey tricked them into it by casually asking Dunne if she could play the piano. She said she could, a little. McCarey then asked Bellamy if he could sing. The actor said he knew the words to the song, but could not sing. McCarey asked them to do the song anyway, telling Bellamy to "belt it out" in an Oklahoman accent. McCarey had their performance filmed, and it turned out so well that he ordered the footage printed. Dunne was furious when she realized McCarey had intended to use the footage in the film all along.

Cinematography and editing
Cinematographer Joseph Walker used mainly long takes when shooting The Awful Truth. With McCarey providing only minimal direction, this helped to make scenes feel spontaneous and energetic. Generally, a scene would only be shot once unless there was a mistake, and shooting days were kept short (often ending at 3 PM). One particular scene, however, took nearly a full day to film. During the film's finale, shot about August 10, Delmar's script called for a cat to block the door connecting Jerry and Lucy's bedrooms, impeding Jerry's attempt at a marital reconciliation. An animal wrangler brought five cats in the morning, but none would stand still. Frustrated, McCarey called another animal wrangler, who soon arrived with three more cats. None would stay still. Three more animal wranglers were called during the day, but none of the cats would perform as required. Finally, McCarey was forced to issue an open call to the public for anyone with a cat who would perform the actions required. When a cat was found that would stay still, the animal refused to move when Cary Grant attempted to open the door.

The Awful Truth was shot primarily on a soundstage at Columbia Pictures' Gower Street studios. Principal photography ended on August 17, 1937, the 37th day of shooting. At end of August, location shooting occurred at Columbia Ranch, the studio's  lot located at the corner of Hollywood Way and Oak Street in Burbank, California. Reshoots on the film occurred during the first week of October.

McCarey did not permit Joseph Walker to shoot much coverage, preferring to "edit in the camera". This left editor Al Clark with few choices once the film began to be pieced together. One major cut made to the film was actor Claud Allister performance as Lord Fabian in the Vance drawing room scene, which was completely excised. Film historian James Harvey says that the comic timing of Walker's editing in the nightclub scene—cutting from Dixie Belle Lee's performance to Jerry, Lucy, and Dan at the table—is "exquisite...unmatched deadpan brilliance".

Previews and release
The Awful Truth was shot in just six weeks, a record for a film of this genre (according to Ralph Bellamy). It was finished ahead of schedule and $200,000 ($ in  dollars) under budget. The film contained several risqué moments which normally would have run afoul of the Motion Picture Production Code, including Jerry making double entendres about coal mines to an oblivious Dan, Dixie Belle Lee's exposed underwear, Lucy "goosing" pompous Mrs. Vance, and the final moment of the film when the cuckoo clock figures go into the same room together. Code administrator Joseph Breen permitted these gags because the picture and its cast were high-quality, which served to undercut the raciness of the moments.

The film was test screened, and the audience's reaction was good but not outstanding. Audiences were unused to seeing the three stars in a comedy, and were unsure whether they should laugh. McCarey realized the opening was too somber, and that viewers were not certain the picture was a comedy. He rewrote the opening scenes, adding one in which Lucy calls her attorney to discuss her impending divorce. A new bit in this scene helped establish the tone of the film more clearly. While on the phone, Lucy's lawyer tries to tell her that "Marriage is a beautiful thing". Each time, his wife (standing in the background of the shot) yells impatiently at him to remind him that dinner is ready. This happens three times. The attorney's response is harsher the second time. The third time, he shouts back "Shut your big mouth!" At a second preview, audiences roared with laughter.

The Awful Truth was released in theaters in the United States on October 21, 1937.

Box office and reception
Gross box office receipts for The Awful Truth were more than $3 million ($ in  dollars). The film made a profit of $500,000 ($ in  dollars) in a year when Columbia Pictures' studio-wide profit margin was just $1.3 million ($ in  dollars).

The Film Daily named The Awful Truth as one of the ten best films of 1937.

Although he was not nominated for an Academy Award for Best Actor, the film was a triumph for Cary Grant. Overnight he was transformed into an A-list leading man. "The Cary Grant Persona" was fully established by this film, and Grant not only became an able improviser but often demanded improvisation in his films thereafter. Ralph Bellamy, however, was typecast for years in "amiable dope" roles after The Awful Truth.

Awards and honors
The film was nominated for six Academy Awards (only winning Best Director for Leo McCarey).

After winning the Oscar, McCarey said he'd won it for the wrong picture, since he considered his direction of the 1937 melodrama Make Way for Tomorrow to be superior.

The Awful Truth was selected in 1996 for preservation in the Library of Congress' National Film Registry for being "culturally, historically, or aesthetically significant".

The film has since been recognized twice by American Film Institute:
 2000: AFI's 100 Years...100 Laughs – #68
 2002: AFI's 100 Years...100 Passions – #77

Subsequent versions
Dunne, Grant, and Bellamy performed scenes from The Awful Truth on the Hollywood Hotel radio program on CBS on October 15, 1937.

The Awful Truth was presented as a one-hour radio program on three occasions on Lux Radio Theatre. On the September 11, 1939 broadcast Grant and Claudette Colbert starred in the adaptation. Bob Hope and Constance Bennett played the leads for the March 10, 1941 version. Dunne and Grant reprised their original lead roles on the January 18, 1955 broadcast.

Dunne reprised her Lucy Warriner role in a 30-minute version of The Awful Truth on The Goodyear Program on CBS on February 6, 1944. Walter Pidgeon played the role of Jerry Warriner.

The play inspired a film musical, Let's Do It Again (1953), starring Jane Wyman and Ray Milland.

Notes

References

Bibliography

External links

 
 
 
 
 
 The Awful Truth: Divorce, McCarey Style an essay by Molly Haskell at the Criterion Collection

1937 films
1937 romantic comedy films
1930s screwball comedy films
American romantic comedy films
American screwball comedy films
American black-and-white films
Columbia Pictures films
Comedy of remarriage films
American films based on plays
Films directed by Leo McCarey
Films whose director won the Best Directing Academy Award
United States National Film Registry films
Films with screenplays by Sidney Buchman
Films adapted into radio programs
Films about divorce
1930s English-language films
1930s American films